Davide Di Veroli (18 August 2001 in Rome) is an Italian left-handed épée fencer and 2022 team European champion.

Medal Record

World Championship

European Championship

Grand Prix

World Cup

References

External links 

 VEROLI-40918/  - FIE
 - buenosaires2018.com

2001 births
Living people
Fencers from Rome
Italian male fencers
Italian épée fencers
Fencers at the 2018 Summer Youth Olympics
Medalists at the 2018 Summer Youth Olympics
Youth Olympic gold medalists for Italy
World Fencing Championships medalists